Nil Lushchak O.F.M. (born Yuriy Yuriyovych Lushchak, ; born May 22, 1973 Uzhhorod, Ukrainian SSR) is a Ukrainian Ruthenian Catholic hierarch, who serves as an Apostolic Administrator of the Eparchy of Mukachevo. Previously served as Auxiliary Bishop of the same eparchy since 19 November 2012 until 20 July 2020.

Life
Born on 22 May 1973 in Uzhhorod, Ukrainian SSR, present day - Ukraine as Yuriy Lushchak. After primary and secondary schools and the military service according to conscription in the Armed Forces of Ukraine he was student rates Philosophy and Theology in the Eparchial Seminary in Uzhhorod.

2 July 1996 was ordained a priest. Later served a variety of pastoral work, was originally vicar, then - the pastor. From 2004 to 2008, studied at the Pontifical Urbaniana University in Rome and where he received a licentiate's degree in philosophy.

In 2009 he entered the mendicant Order of Friars Minor, where he took the religious name "Nil" in honour of Saint Nil of Grottaferrata and in 2010 has made temporal vows.

November 19, 2012, the Pope Benedict XVI appointed Fr. Nil titular bishop of Flenucleta, Auxiliary Bishop of the Eparchy of Mukachevo.

In December 4, 2012 Elected Bishop Nil made his solemn profession in the Franciscan community.

In addition to native Ukrainian, Lushchak can speak Italian and Russian.

References

External links

1973 births
Clergy from Uzhhorod
Ruthenian Catholic bishops
Pontifical Urban University alumni
Ukrainian Friars Minor
Franciscan bishops
Living people
20th-century Eastern Catholic clergy
21st-century Eastern Catholic bishops